Six ships of the United States Navy have been named USS Tennessee in honor of the 16th state.

 , originally Tennessee, was a paddlewheel steamer captured from the Confederacy at New Orleans on 2 April 1862.
  was a Confederate ironclad captured from the Confederacy in the Battle of Mobile Bay on 16 February 1864.
  was a wooden screw frigate originally built and named as Madawaska.
  was the lead ship of her class of armored cruiser.
  was the lead ship of her class of battleship, was severely damaged and capsized at the Attack on Pearl Harbor, repaired and saw action in the Pacific during World War II, broken up 1959.
  is an

See also
  of the U.S. Navy in the Interwar period
  of the U.S. Navy at the turn of the 20th century
 
 
 Tennessee (disambiguation)

United States Navy ship names